The 2010 Martyr's Memorial A-Division League (known as the Martyrs' Memorial San Miguel 'A' Division League Football Tournament 2010 for sponsorship reasons) was the 38th season of the Martyr's Memorial A-Division League since its establishment in 1954/55. A total of 12 teams competed in the league. The season began on 12 February 2010 and concluded on 14 June 2010.

It was the first time the League held since 2006-07, as the seasons in the mean time were cancelled due to conflicts between ANFA and the clubs.''

Defending champion Nepal Police Club has won the league with two matches remaining.

1971 League Champion Boys Union Club was relegated to B Division after 58 years in league history by the goal difference with APF Club having the equal 22 points whereas losing the 15 matches among 22 three times league champion Sankata Club also relegated to B Division after 37 years.

Teams

League table

Awards

Notes

References

External links
 https://web.archive.org/web/20100616103206/http://www.myrepublica.com/portal/index.php?action=news_details&news_id=19889
 https://web.archive.org/web/20160303192319/http://myrepublica.com/portal/index.php?action=news_details&news_id=19839
 http://soccerinnepal.blogspot.com/

Martyr's Memorial A-Division League seasons
1
Nepal